Carey College may refer to the following:

Carey College, Colombo 
Carey Baptist College, New Zealand
Carey Baptist College, Perth
Carey College, New Zealand
William Carey College, United States